John Cann may refer to:

 John Cann (politician) (1860–1940), New South Wales politician
 John Cann (athlete) (born 1938), Australian athlete
 John Du Cann (1946–2011), English guitarist